Jim True-Frost (né True; July 31, 1966) is an American stage, television and screen actor.  He is most known for his portrayal of Roland "Prez" Pryzbylewski on all five seasons of the HBO program The Wire,  as James Woodrow in Treme (2010-2012), and film roles such as Singles (1992).

Biography
True-Frost graduated from New Trier High School in Winnetka, Illinois. He has been an ensemble member of the Steppenwolf Theatre Company in Chicago since 1989. Prior to that, he was a member of Remains Theater, co-founded by actor William L. Petersen (To Live and Die in L.A., CSI: Crime Scene Investigation). True-Frost appeared in the film Off the Map with fellow Steppenwolf ensemble member Joan Allen, directed by Singles co-star Campbell Scott.  He has performed on Broadway and as far away as Sierra Leone.

When he married lawyer and legal scholar Cora Frost in 1999, both changed their last names to True-Frost. Jim and his wife now reside in Syracuse, New York, and have two children, a son named Leo and a daughter named Phoebe.

True-Frost appeared in 2008 as Brutus in the American Repertory Theatre's production of William Shakespeare's Julius Caesar, as well as Steppenwolf's Broadway run of August: Osage County, which won the Tony for Best Play.

Filmography

Films

Television

References

External links

1966 births
Living people
New Trier High School alumni
Male actors from Illinois
American male television actors
American male film actors
20th-century American male actors
21st-century American male actors
Steppenwolf Theatre Company players